The London Pirates were a Class-D minor league baseball team based in London, Ontario, Canada. The team was a member of the Pennsylvania–Ontario–New York League, which later became the New York–Penn League. The team played for just two seasons, 1940–1941, and were affiliated with the Pittsburgh Pirates throughout its existence.

References
1940 London Pirates Baseball Reference

Baseball teams established in 1940
Defunct New York–Penn League teams
Baseball teams disestablished in 1941
Pittsburgh Pirates minor league affiliates
1940 establishments in Ontario
1941 disestablishments in Ontario